Adiri is a large, bright albedo feature on Saturn's moon Titan. It is named after the paradise in Melanesian mythology. It is located to the west of the large, dark region of Shangri-la.

Adiri is a region of high ground and appears to be riddled with drainage channels. The Huygens probe landed on a plain just off the northwest 'coast' of Adiri in 2005.

Surface features of Titan (moon)